Lynd School, also known as the Stamper's Creek Township School #2, is a historic one-room school located in Stampers Creek Township, Orange County, Indiana.  It was built about 1900, and is a one-story, rectangular, frame building. It has a gable front facade topped by a small belfry and measures 24 feet wide and 36 feet long.  It was renovated in 1925, and a kitchen / bathroom addition was built about 1970.  The building remained in use as a school until 1964.

It was listed on the National Register of Historic Places in 2002.

References 

One-room schoolhouses in Indiana
School buildings on the National Register of Historic Places in Indiana
School buildings completed in 1900
Buildings and structures in Orange County, Indiana
National Register of Historic Places in Orange County, Indiana
1900 establishments in Indiana